Ecnomiohyla minera is a species of frog in the family Hylidae.
It is endemic to Guatemala.
Its natural habitat is subtropical or tropical moist montane forests.
It is threatened by habitat loss.

References

Ecnomiohyla
Endemic fauna of Guatemala
Amphibians of Guatemala
Endangered fauna of North America
Amphibians described in 1985
Taxonomy articles created by Polbot